The Stranger from Pecos is a 1943 American Western film directed by Lambert Hillyer and written by Adele Buffington. This is the second film in the "Marshal Nevada Jack McKenzie" series, and stars Johnny Mack Brown as Jack McKenzie and Raymond Hatton as his sidekick Sandy Hopkins, with Kirby Grant, Christine McIntyre, Steve Clark and Edmund Cobb. The film was released on July 10, 1943, by Monogram Pictures.

Plot

Cast           
Johnny Mack Brown as Nevada Jack McKenzie
Raymond Hatton as Sandy Hopkins
Kirby Grant as Tom Barstow
Christine McIntyre as Ruth Martin
Steve Clark as Clem Martin
Edmund Cobb as Bert Salem
Sam Flint as Jonathan Ward 
Charles King as Harmon 
Roy Barcroft as Sheriff Ben
Bud Osborne as Gus
Artie Ortego as Ed 
Lynton Brent as Deputy Joe
Milburn Morante as Pete 
Robert Frazer as Bill Barstow
Frosty Royce as Henchman
Kermit Maynard as Bud Salem

References

External links

American black-and-white films
American Western (genre) films
1943 Western (genre) films
Monogram Pictures films
Films directed by Lambert Hillyer
1940s American films
1940s English-language films